Askam may refer to:

Askam, Cumbria, a village in Cumbria, England
Askam (trucks), a Turkish truck manufacturer
A village in Hanover Township, Luzerne County, Pennsylvania, United States